The Greater Monrovia District, i.e. the district covering the Liberian capital Monrovia is divided into 160+ communities, below listed by municipal administration and electoral district;

References

Monrovia